Corynandra is a genus of flowering plants in the family Cleomaceae (sometime given in Capparaceae).

References

External links 

 
 Corynandra at Tropicos

Brassicales genera
Cleomaceae